Fred D. Kaplan is an American bridge player.

Bridge accomplishments

Wins

 North American Bridge Championships (4)
 Hilliard Mixed Pairs (1) 1938 
 Vanderbilt (2) 1936, 1943 
 Wernher Open Pairs (1) 1936

Runners-up

 North American Bridge Championships (3)
 Spingold (1) 1937 
 Spingold (1) 1938 
 Wernher Open Pairs (1) 1943

Notes

American contract bridge players